Attorney General Sharp may refer to:

Ernest Hamilton Sharp (1861–1922), Attorney General for Hong Kong
Solomon P. Sharp (1787–1825), Attorney General of Kentucky

See also
Merrell Q. Sharpe (1888–1962), Attorney General of South Dakota
General Sharp (disambiguation)